Bombo may refer to:

Music
Bombo (musical), a 1921 Broadway production starring Al Jolson
"Bombo" (song), by Norwegian singer Adelén
Bombo criollo or just bombo, a family of Latin American drums
Bombo legüero, an Argentine drum
An 18th-century term for tremolo
An album from Swedish rock band Bonafide

Places
Bombo, New South Wales, a suburb of the Municipality of Kiama, Australia
Bombo, Uganda, a town in Luwero District
A ward in Same District, Tanzania

People
Aama Bombo, shaman in the Nepalese Tamang tradition
Bombo Calandula (born 1983), Angolan former team handball player
Bombo Rivera (born 1952), Puerto Rican former Major League Baseball player nicknamed "Bombo"

Other uses
Bombo Radyo Philippines, a large Filipino radio network
, an Australian coastal freighter that foundered in 1949
Bombo (video game), a 1986 British game on the Commodore 64
Bombo, the ball used in chaza, a Colombian racquet sport

See also
 Bomba (disambiguation)
 Bombe (disambiguation)